The European Convention on Recognition and Enforcement of Decisions concerning Custody of Children and on Restoration of Custody of Children is an international treaty of the Council of Europe that deals with international child abduction.  Like the Hague Abduction Convention it was drafted in 1980 and entered into force in 1983.

Starting 1 March 2005 the European Convention has been largely superseded by the Revised Brussels II Regulation and mostly only operates with countries which are not members of the European Union or in respect to certain orders which pre-date the Revised Brussels II.

Both the Hague Convention and the European Convention have the same purpose; to deter international child abduction and to secure the return of children wrongfully removed or retained from their home country. Although they are both founded on the well recognized principles that decisions regarding the care and welfare of children are best made in the country within which they have the closest connection, and that orders made in that home country should be recognized and enforced in other countries, the two Conventions have different ways of achieving those goals.

The European Convention works on the principle of the mutual recognition and enforcement of orders made in contracting states. Accordingly, there must be in existence an order of a court or other authority with the necessary jurisdiction in a Convention Country, which can be recognized and enforced in the receiving state.

Even prior to the Revised Brussels II, the European Convention was rarely used in abduction cases where a child's return was sought because it only operates where an order already exists. It has more frequent application to the enforcement of access orders.

See also
International child abduction
Hague Abduction Convention
List of Council of Europe treaties

References

External links
Council of Europe information on treaty.
Treaty text.

Juvenile law
Family law treaties
Treaties concluded in 1980
Treaties entered into force in 1983
Child custody
Treaties of Andorra
Treaties of Austria
Treaties of Belgium
Treaties of Bulgaria
Treaties of Cyprus
Treaties of the Czech Republic
Treaties of Denmark
Treaties of Estonia
Treaties of Finland
Treaties of France
Treaties of Germany
Treaties of Greece
Treaties of Hungary
Treaties of Iceland
Treaties of Ireland
Treaties of Italy
Treaties of Latvia
Treaties of Liechtenstein
Treaties of Lithuania
Treaties of Luxembourg
Treaties of Malta
Treaties of Montenegro
Treaties of the Netherlands
Treaties of Norway
Treaties of Poland
Treaties of Portugal
Treaties of Romania
Treaties of Serbia and Montenegro
Treaties of Slovakia
Treaties of Slovenia
Treaties of Spain
Treaties of Sweden
Treaties of North Macedonia
Treaties of Switzerland
Treaties of Turkey
Treaties of Ukraine
Treaties of the United Kingdom
Treaties of Yugoslavia
Children's rights treaties
Child custody
1980 in Luxembourg
Treaties extended to the Isle of Man
Treaties extended to the Cayman Islands
Treaties extended to the Falkland Islands
Treaties extended to Montserrat
Treaties extended to Jersey
Treaties extended to Anguilla